Jamiatur Raza is an Islamic seminary situated in Bareilly, India. It was established by Akhtar Raza Khan in 2000.

The founders have evolved a plan to develop it into an Islamic university. Presently, it is being supervised by the son of Mufti Akhtar Raza Khan, Asjad Raza Khan, who is also Chief Mufti of Sunni Muslims of India.

About Madarsa
The Madrasa was established with 250 students and at present one thousand students are studying up to the level of Tahtania, Fauqania and Aalia which is approved by Madrasa Education Board. Many courses approved or recognized by the National Institute of Open Schooling (NIOS) are also taught. Master and PhD level courses in association with a Al Azhar university are being run.

Curriculum
It follows following curriculum.
Secondary Stage:
Duration three years from Class VI to VIII
Higher Stage:
Duration 7 years. It is divided into three sub-stages:
Molviyah Duration 2 Years (Equivalent High School)
Aalimah - Duration 2 Years (Equivalent Inter Mediate)
Fadeelah - Duration 3 Years (Equivalent Graduation)

Department of Specialization
It offers specialization in Fiqh, Tafseer, Hadith, Arabic literature, World Religion

Department of Memorization of the Quran and Its Recitation
Three years course of Quran

Method of study
The syllabus is based on Arabic and Persian but our syllabus is combination of Islamic issues Arabic, Persian and Modern Education also.

See also
Barelvi
Ahmed Raza Khan
Manzar-e-Islam
Al Jamiatul Ashrafia
Al-Jame-atul-Islamia

References

Islamic universities and colleges in India
Madrasas in India
Universities and colleges in Uttar Pradesh
Education in Bareilly
Barelvi Islamic universities and colleges
Memorials to Ahmed Raza Khan Barelvi